O'Connor Catholic College, formerly O'Connor Catholic High School, is an independent Catholic co-educational [secondary day school, located in Armidale, New South Wales, Australia. It was created by an amalgamation of St Ursula's College and De La Salle College.

History
The college was formed in 1975 with the amalgamation of two of Armidale's longest-established schools – St Ursula's College (est. 1882 by Sister Mary Cordula) and De La Salle College (est. 1906).

The college takes its name from Patrick O'Connor, Bishop of Armidale from 1904–1930 who contributed greatly to Catholic education in the Diocese during that time.

Description
O’Connor Catholic College is a systemic secondary school in the Diocese of Armidale. It  occupies the site of the former De La Salle College.

O’Connor has as its motto the quote from St Paul's Letter to the Galatians, "The Fruit of the Spirit is Love".

Alumni
Lyall Munro Jnr, from the Aboriginal mission at Moree was attending De la Salle College in 1966 when, at the age of 14, he attained his instructor's badge in lifesaving.

See also

 List of Catholic schools in New South Wales
 Catholic education in Australia

References

Educational institutions established in 1975
Catholic secondary schools in New South Wales
Schools in Armidale, New South Wales
1975 establishments in Australia
Lasallian schools in Australia